West Carter High School is a high school located in Olive Hill, Kentucky and is part of the Carter County Schools System. Its mascot is the Comet, and the colors are maroon, blue, and white. The school motto is "We Champion High Success". The principal is Karen Tackett; the assistant principals are Kristen Bledsoe and Daniel Barker.

Scheduling information
West Carter High School is now following "trimester" scheduling. Students are able to choose a new schedule three times a year instead of
one. This trimester scheduling is an opportunity for students to earn 7.5 credits a year. All underclassman are required to take Math, Science, English, and Social Studies. Besides the "core" classes students may sign up for electives, which are classes based on goals and interests.  (5)

Attendance
It is believed by the Carter County Board of Education that there is a direct relationship between poor attendance and lack of achievement.

Illness of the student is excused, with parent note for up to 3 days per trimester. For longer than that limit a health care professional note is required.(4)

Athletics
Archery
Baseball
Basketball- Boys
Basketball- Girls
Cheerleading
Cross Country
Football
Golf
Soccer
Softball
Tennis
Track and Field
Volleyball   (6)

Lady Comets basketball
The West Carter Lady Comet Team was founded in 1974. It won the state championship for the first time in 2000. The coach at the time was John "Hop" Brown, the assistant coaches were Von Perry and Dana Smith, and the team members were Leah Frasier, Chelsea Hamilton, Cassondra Glover, Jenise James, Mandy Sterling, Megen Gearhart, Cathy Day, Kandi Brown, Shanna Shelton, Kayla Jones, Brooke Mullis, Nicki Burchett, Meghan Hillman, and Robin Butler.

Kandi Brown was named 'Most Valuable Player.' On the All Tournament team joining her were Megen Gearhart and Mandy Sterling.(6)

Extra-curricular eligibility
Students must be passing 2/3 of classes to engage in extracurricular activities. Students leaving school early are not allowed to attend practice or a game. Any student on out-of-school suspension shall not take part in any extra-curricular activity until the suspension has been lifted.(3)

Dress code
Shorts and skirts must be knee length
No sleeveless tops and no tank top
No undergarment to be seen
No holes above the knee
No hats, bandanas, ascots, or other headwear in the building
No drug, alcohol, tobacco or otherwise inappropriate advertisement or logos(1)

References

"West Carter High School - School Policies" , Retrieved 2010-12-8
"West Carter High School - Administration", Retrieved 2010-7-12.
"West Carter High School; Policies: Eligibility", Retrieved 2010-8-12
"West Carter High School - Scheduling Guide" , Retrieved 2010-7-12
"West Carter High School - Sports Zone", Retrieved 2010-8-12
"Congressional Record: In Honor of the West Carter Girls Basketball Team; Hon. Ken Lucas", Retrieved 2010-8-12

Public high schools in Kentucky
Schools in Carter County, Kentucky